Daniel Douglas may refer to:

 Daniel Douglas, an earlier pseudonym of Claude Cahun (1894–1954), French Surrealist photographer, sculptor, and writer
 Daniel Douglas Eley (1914–2015), British chemist
 Daniel Douglas Hutto, American philosopher
 Daniel Dunglas Home (1833–1886), Scottish medium
 Douglas Daniel Braga (born 1985), Brazilian footballer